Shane Price, (born 26 December 1986 in Melbourne, Victoria, Australia) is an Australian motor racing driver who raced for two seasons in the V8 Supercar Championship Series in 2007 and 2008. He has been a front runner in several different motor racing series and is a former New Zealand Superkart champion.

The son of multiple Kart champion Drew Price and nephew to female racer Melinda Price, Price grew up around the sport. In 2006 after finishing runner up in the Victorian and Australian Formula Ford Championships, V8 Supercar team Perkins Motorsport gave him his first foray into the Fujitsu V8 Supercar Series, finishing runner up again, this time to Adam Macrow.

In 2007, Larry Perkins promoted Price to the main series in the Jack Daniel's Racing VE Commodore. This was his first full season in the top V8 series in Australia.                                                                                                                                        
2008 saw him continue with Jack Daniel's Racing until he was replaced by his 2006 Fujitsu V8 series teammate Jack Perkins after round 10 due after the team struggled through the season.

In 2008 he was chosen by Holden as one of the drivers for the 2008 WPS Bathurst 12 Hour in a Holden Commodore Sportswagon although a result was not forthcoming as the car struggled with brake problems. 2009 saw a return to the Fujitsu series and a debut in Superkarts. His first Superkart meeting in New Zealand saw Price take out the national championship.

Career results

Complete Bathurst 1000 results

References 
 Holden Bio
 Media
 V8Supercar Bio
 Official Web page

1986 births
Formula Ford drivers
Living people
Racing drivers from Melbourne
Supercars Championship drivers